This is a list of films produced by the Ollywood film industry based in Bhubaneshwar and Cuttack in 1995:

A-Z

References

1995
Ollywood
Ollywood
1990s in Orissa
1995 in Indian cinema